Suvam Sen (born 14 November 1989) is an Indian professional footballer who plays as a goalkeeper for East Bengal in the Indian Super League.

Statistics

References

External links 

 ISL profile
Soccerway profile

Indian Super League players
East Bengal Club players
1989 births
Footballers from West Bengal
Living people
Indian footballers
Association football goalkeepers